U.S. Highway 75 (US 75) is a part of the U.S. Highway System that travels from Interstate 345 (I-345) in Dallas, Texas northward to the Canadian border at Noyes, Minnesota. In the state of Texas it runs from I-345 in Dallas and heads north to the Oklahoma state line.

History
In the initial assignment of state highways in 1917, Dallas-Fort Worth and Houston were connected by a branch of State Highway 2 (SH 2, the Meridian Highway), which ran via Waco and Bryan and continued on to Galveston. The more direct route followed by US 75 was not initially part of the system between Richland (connected to Dallas by SH 14) and Huntsville (connected to Houston by SH 19). This Richland–Huntsville cutoff was added by 1919 as SH 32, and US 75 was assigned to the alignment, as well as SH 6 north of Dallas, in 1926. The branch of SH 2, which US 75 followed between Houston and Galveston, eventually became part of SH 6, and these numbers were dropped in the 1939 renumbering.

Prior to the coming of the Interstate Highway System in the late 1950s, the only improvements to US 75 in Texas beyond building a two-lane paved roadway were in the Houston and Dallas areas. However, the highways in and near these cities included some of the first freeways in the state: the Gulf Freeway (Houston, opened to traffic on October 1, 1948) and the Central Expressway (Dallas). When Interstate 45 was built in the 1960s, its alignment bypassed many of the towns and built-up areas between downtown Dallas and Houston. The bypassed routes retained the US 75 designation until the designation was truncated to downtown Dallas in 1987. Many of the original alignments continue to exist under other designations.

In Dallas, the route followed what is now the Good Latimer Expressway (formerly Spur 559) southeast, out of downtown, along US 175 and south along State Highway 310.

Near Ferris, Trumbull, Palmer, Ennis, and Corsicana Interstate 45 veers east to avoid the more populated areas. The old US 75 alignments through these towns, decommissioned in 1987, now carry the following designations:

Business Interstate Highway 45-J (originally Loop 560) through Ferris
Loop 561 through Trumbull
Business Interstate Highway 45-H through Palmer (originally Loop 562)
Spur 469, Business Interstate Highway 45-G (originally U.S. Highway 287 and Spur 563) through Ennis
Business Interstate Highway 45-F (originally Loop 564) through Corsicana

Through Streetman, Fairfield, Buffalo, Centerville, Madisonville, Huntsville, New Waverly, Willis, and Conroe, US 75 followed what is now State Highway 75.

In Galveston, the alignment of State Highway 87 from 20th Street to the southern terminus Interstate 45 was also part of US 75 until its 1987 truncation.

In other cases alignments were bypassed while US 75 remained in existence; they now carry the following designations:
State Highway 3 through La Marque, Dickinson, League City, South Houston and Houston, bypassed 1952
State Highway 5 from north of Dallas via Plano, McKinney, Anna and Van Alstyne to Howe, bypassed 1959-1967
State Highway 91 from Sherman to Denison, bypassed 1984

Route description
US 75 begins at I-345, an unsigned auxiliary route of I-45 and heads north, first interchanging Spur 366 northeast of Dallas. The highway then interchanges with SL 12 (Northwest Highway) before forming the High Five Interchange with I-635. Then, it interchanges with  the President George Bush Turnpike as it continues north through Plano. It then interchanges with the Sam Rayburn Tollway, becoming concurrent with SH 121 and then heads through McKinney and interchanging with US 380. The stretch through McKinney is largely unchanged from its original design except for its intersection at the Sam Rayburn Tollway. to replace the original interchange. Plans to upgrade the facility through and north of McKinney are under way with the reconstruction of the US 380 bridge. US 75 then splits from SH 121 in Melissa and continues north. In Sherman, the route crosses over SH 56 and then US 82. North of Denison, it becomes concurrent with US 69 for the next  before crossing over the Red River and into Oklahoma.

The exit numbers for US 75 are not based on mile markers; instead, the exits were numbered consecutively (the only remaining stretch of road in Texas with such a system). As the bypass route was completed around the Sherman–Denison area, the numbering system was continued for the new exits. Upon completion of the widened Central Expressway through Dallas, the exit numbering was changed for the section south of I-635 to correspond with the new (and fewer number of) exits, based on mileage, but the numbering system north of I-635 was left unchanged, thus explaining the gap in the current numbering system.

Exit list

See also

References

External links

US 75 info page - at dfwfreeways.info

Freeways in Texas
75
 Texas
Transportation in Dallas County, Texas
Transportation in Collin County, Texas
Transportation in Grayson County, Texas